Forgotten New York is a website created by Kevin Walsh in 1999, chronicling the unnoticed and unchronicled aspects of New York City such as painted building ads, decades-old castiron lampposts, 18th-century houses, abandoned subway stations, trolley track remnants, out-of-the-way neighborhoods, and flashes of nature hidden in the midst of the big city. In 2003, HarperCollins approached Walsh with the idea of turning the website into a book; Forgotten New York was published in September 2006.

Walsh released Forgotten Queens, a collaboration with the Greater Astoria Historical Society, in December 2013 on Arcadia Books, is currently composing a book proposal for a second Forgotten New York book, and is working on mounting online tours for the fall and winter of 2021-2022.

On March 2, 2015, the Guides Association of New York City awarded Forgotten New York its first Outstanding New York Website award.

See also
Forgotten Chicago

References

External links
 Forgotten New York
 Greater Astoria Historical Society

History websites of the United States
History of New York City
Urban exploration
Internet properties established in 1999
1999 establishments in New York City